was a professional wrestling event promoted by World Wonder Ring Stardom. It took place on December 20, 2020 in Osaka, Japan, at the Osaka Prefectural Gymnasium with a limited attendance due in part to the ongoing COVID-19 pandemic at the time.

Storylines

The show featured seven professional wrestling matches that resulted from scripted storylines, where wrestlers portrayed villains, heroes, or less distinguishable characters in the scripted events that built tension and culminated in a wrestling match or series of matches.

Event
The preshow in which Saya Iida defeated Saya Kamitani and a defending champion Maika for the Future of Stardom Championship was broadcast live on Stardom's YouTube channel. After Mina Shirakawa, Tam Nakano and Unagi Sayaka retained the Artist of Stardom Championship over Stars stablemates Gokigen Death, Mayu Iwatani and Starlight Kid, they announced that they would split up from Stars to act as an independent unit. Since Shirakawa's debut on October 25, 2020, Cosmic Angels acted as a sub-unit of Stars. The sixth match had Donna Del Mondo stablemates Giulia and Syuri ending their short term feud after going into a time-limit draw with both Wonder of Stardom Championship and SWA World Championship on the table. After the match, they peacefully shook hands in sign of mutual respect. Stardom's president Rossy Ogawa revealed the design of the promotion's sleek new black and white logo, ditching the old pink logo.

The main event portraited Utami Hayashishita successfully defending the World of Stardom Championship for the first time in that respective reign against Queen's Quest stablemate and leader Momo Watanabe. After the match concluded, Maika stepped up to challenge Hayashishita for the title in the near future. Maika defeated Hayashishita in the 5STAR Grand Prix tournament, and therefore was expected to make a challenge for the title at some point.

Results

References

External links
Page Stardom World

2020 in professional wrestling
Professional wrestling in Osaka
Women's professional wrestling shows
World Wonder Ring Stardom shows
World Wonder Ring Stardom